The Gonella Hut (French: Refuge Francesco Gonella; Italian: Rifugio Francesco Gonella and sometimes called Rifugio del Dôme; or Refuge du Dôme) is a high elevation mountain hut in the Aosta Valley in the Mont Blanc massif area of the Alps. It lies at an elevation of 3071 metres, above Val Veny near Courmayeur in Italy. The refuge is located on the Italian 'normal route' to Mont Blanc.

History 
The old winter hut remains open all year round.

Access 
The Refuge Gonella is situated on the Aiguilles Grises ridge that separates the Dôme glacier from the Glacier de Bionnassay Italien.

The climb to the refuge starts at La Visaille / plan Lognan (1,670 m) and follows the track towards Plan Combal (1,990 m). Not far away lies the Lake Miage. Near the Ghiacciaio del Miage glacier is the trailhead S15 leading to the hut at 3071 m.

At 2,500 m flows on the Dôme du Goûter result in the Ghiacciaio del Dome glacier (Fr. Glacier du Dome) of the Miage. At about 2,400 m, the Mont Blanc glacier (French: Glacier du Mont Blanc) is reached, which is fed from the southwest slopes of Mont Blanc.

At an elevation of 2,650 m the trail finally leaves the Miage glaciers and rises over steep rocks to the hut. It takes approximately 5 ½ hours reach the Gonella Refuge from La Visaille, graded at F

Mountaineering

Summit ascents 

The following peaks can be reached from the Gonella Refuge:

 Aiguille Grises - (3,837 m)
 Dôme du Goûter - (4,304 m)
 Aiguille de Bionnassay - (4052 m)
 Mont Blanc (4,810 m)

Hut to hut 
Reaching any other hut from the Gonella Refuge involves serious mountaineering on glacial terrain at elevations above 4,000 metres.
 Grands Mulets Hut (3,050 m) on the Col du Dôme (4,237 m).
 Goûter Hut (3,817 m) on the Col du Dôme.
 Tête Rousse Hut (3,197 m) over the Col de Bionassay (3892 m).
 Durier Hut (3,349 m) over the Aiguille de Bionnassay to the Col de Miage (3,356 m).

References

External links 
 Location of Gonella Hut on French IGN mapping portal
 Rifugio Gonella website (Italian)
 Access to Refuge Gonella (French)
 Gonella Refuge—YouTube video showing inside of refuge
 From Courmayeur to the Refuge Gonella

Mountain huts in Aosta Valley
Mountain huts in the Alps